Łacha  is a village in the administrative district of Gmina Serock, within Legionowo County, Masovian Voivodeship, in east-central Poland.

Lacha was primarily a village of ethnic Germans before World War 2.

References

Villages in Legionowo County